Bernterode may refer to two places in Thuringia, Germany:

Bernterode (bei Heilbad Heiligenstadt)
Bernterode (bei Worbis)